Robert Lawrence MacDonald (born September 5, 1978) is a  Canadian mixed martial artist. From 2002 until 2009, he competed in various high-profile promotions including the UFC, Maximum Fighting Championship, and was a competitor on The Ultimate Fighter 2, where he was the first Canadian to fight on the show. He later returned to competition for The Ultimate Fighter 30 in 2022.

Background
Rob was a nationally ranked wrestler at St. Charles College (Sudbury) in Ontario and also excelled on the football and track teams. He graduated Western Ontario University with degrees in English and Psychology.

Mixed martial arts career
MacDonald made his professional mixed martial arts debut on June 1, 2002, when he faced Zane Hagel at MFC 4: New Groundz. He won the fight via first round submission strikes. After the impressive victory, MacDonald would win two more professional fights, defeating Victor Valimaki and Doug Sauer via TKO. MacDonald would take a three-year hiatus before being signed by the Ultimate Fighting Championship in 2006.

Ultimate Fighting Championship
MacDonald signed with UFC in early 2006, and made his debut against Jason Lambert at UFC 58 on March 4, 2006. He lost the fight via first round kimura. He then faced Kristian Rothaermel at UFC Ultimate Fight Night 5 on June 28, 2006. He won the fight via armbar submission.

In his third fight in the promotion, MacDonald faced Eric Schafer at UFC 62 on August 26, 2006. He lost the fight via arm-triangle choke, and after dropping to 1–2, was subsequently released from the promotion.

Post-UFC career
In his first fight outside of the UFC, MacDonald challenged Eliot Marshall for the ROF Light Heavyweight Championship at Ring of Fire 31 on December 1, 2007. He won the fight via second-round TKO. MacDonald faced Hector Ramirez at HCF: Crow's Nest on March 29, 2008. He lost the fight via unanimous decision.

He then faced Chuck Grigsby at VFC 26: Onslaught for the VFC Light Heavyweight Championship on February 20, 2009. He lost the fight via KO.

Return to Fighting
In 2022, it was reported that MacDonald would make his return to fighting after 14 years to compete on Season 30 of The Ultimate Fighter. MacDonald faced Eduardo Perez on episode 5 of TUF. He lost the fight via TKO in round one.

Gym Jones
For several years MacDonald was the Training Director and GM at Gym Jones; a fitness training facility in Salt Lake City founded by Mark Twight.

Championships and accomplishments
Ring of Fire
ROF Light Heavyweight Championship (One time)
Ultimate Fighting Championship
Submission of the Night (One time) vs. Kristian Rothaermel

Mixed martial arts record

|-
| Loss
| align=center| 5–4
| Chuck Grigsby
| KO (punches)
| VFC 26: Onslaught
| 
| align=center| 1
| align=center| 4:21
| Council Bluffs, Iowa, United States
| 
|-
| Loss
| align=center| 5–3
| Hector Ramirez
| Decision (unanimous)
| HCF: Crow's Nest
| 
| align=center| 3
| align=center| 5:00
| Gatineau, Quebec, Canada
| 
|-
| Win
| align=center| 5–2
| Eliot Marshall
| TKO (punches)
| Ring of Fire 31
| 
| align=center| 2
| align=center| 1:41
| Broomfield, Colorado, United States
| 
|-
| Loss
| align=center| 4–2
| Eric Schafer
| Submission (arm-triangle choke)
| UFC 62: Liddell vs. Sobral
| 
| align=center| 1
| align=center| 2:26
| Las Vegas, Nevada, United States
| 
|-
| Win
| align=center| 4–1
| Kristian Rothaermel
| Submission (armbar)
| UFC Fight Night 5
| 
| align=center| 1
| align=center| 4:01
| Las Vegas, Nevada, United States
| 
|-
| Loss
| align=center| 3–1
| Jason Lambert
| Submission (kimura)
| UFC 58: USA vs. Canada
| 
| align=center| 1
| align=center| 1:54
| Las Vegas, Nevada, United States
|Light Heavyweight debut.
|-
| Win
| align=center| 3–0
| Doug Sauer
| N/A
| TFC 8: Hell Raiser
| 
| align=center| 1
| align=center| N/A
| Toledo, Ohio, United States
| 
|-
| Win
| align=center| 2–0
| Victor Valimaki
| TKO (corner stoppage)
| MFC 5: Sweet Redemption
| 
| align=center| 1
| align=center| 5:00
| Edmonton, Alberta, Canada
| 
|-
| Win
| align=center| 1–0
| Zane Hagel
| TKO (submission to punches)
| MFC 4: New Groundz
| 
| align=center| 1
| align=center| N/A
| Calgary, Alberta, Canada
| 

|-
| Loss
| align=center | 0–2
| Eduardo Perez 
| TKO (punches and elbows)
| rowspan=1|The Ultimate Fighter: Team Peña vs. Team Nunes
|  (air date)
| align=center | 1
| align=center | 3:58
| rowspan=2|Las Vegas, Nevada, United States
| 
|-
| Loss
| align=center | 0–1
| Brad Imes
| Submission (triangle choke)
| rowspan=1|The Ultimate Fighter 2
|  (air date)
| align=center | 1
| align=center | 4:10
|

References

External links
Project Maximus
Official Bobby Maximus website
Official Lisa Maximus website
UFC profile

1978 births
Canadian male mixed martial artists
Light heavyweight mixed martial artists
Living people
Sportspeople from Greater Sudbury
Ultimate Fighting Championship male fighters